The Old Man in the Corner is an unnamed armchair detective who appears in a series of short stories written by Baroness Orczy. He examines and solves crimes while sitting in the corner of a genteel London tea-room in conversation with a female journalist. He was one of the first of this character-type created in the wake of the huge popularity of the Sherlock Holmes stories. The character's moniker is used as the title of the collection of the earliest stories featuring the character.

Publishing history
The character first appeared in The Royal Magazine in 1901 in a series of six "Mysteries of London".  The following year he returned in seven "Mysteries of Great Cities" set in large provincial centers of the British Isles. The stories are told by an unnamed lady journalist who reports the conversation of the 'man in the corner' who sits at the same table in the A.B.C. teashop. For the book, twelve were rewritten in the third person, with the lady journalist now named Polly Burton. The title, The Old Man in the Corner (U.S. edition: The Man in the Corner) was given to one of the book collections of the earliest stories. Although it contains the earliest written stories in the series, they were not collected in book form until four years after the chronologically later stories in The Case of Miss Elliott (1905). The last book in the series is the much later Unravelled Knots (1925).

Scenario
The Old Man concentrates mostly upon sensationalistic newspaper accounts, with the occasional courtroom visit, and relates all this while tying complicated knots in a piece of string. The plots themselves are typical of Edwardian crime fiction, resting on a foundation of unhappy marriages and the inequitable division of family property. Other period details include a murder in the London Underground, the murder of a female doctor, and two cases involving artists living in "bohemian" lodgings. Another new and noteworthy feature is that no one is ever brought to justice. Though the villains are identified by the narrator (who disdains to inform the police), most cannot be proven guilty beyond a reasonable doubt. The final story reveals that the Old Man himself is a criminal, due to some of his trademark knotted rope being found at crime scene.

Stories
The stories included in this volume are:

 The Fenchurch Street Mystery
 The Robbery in Phillimore Terrace
 The York Mystery 
 The Mysterious Death on the Underground Railway
 The Liverpool Mystery 
 The Edinburgh Mystery 
 The Theft at the English Provident Bank
 The Dublin Mystery 
  An Unparalleled Outrage (The Brighton Mystery) 
 The Regent's Park Murder
 The De Genneville Peerage (The Birmingham Mystery) 
 The Mysterious Death in Percy Street

Film and other media

The Old Man in the Corner was featured in a series of twelve British two-reel silent films, made by Stoll Pictures in 1924, written and directed by Hugh Croise and starring Rolf Leslie as The Old Man and Renee Wakefield as journalist Mary Hatley (Polly Burton in the book). These featured mysteries from each of the three collections:

 The Kensington Mystery (The Tragedy in Dartmoor Terrace)
 The Affair at the Novelty Theatre
 The Tragedy at Barnsdale Manor
 The York Mystery 
 The Brighton Mystery
 The Northern Mystery (?)
 The Regent's Park Mystery
 The Mystery of Dogstooth Cliff
 The Mystery of Brudenell Court
 The Mystery of the Khaki Tunic
 The Tremarne Case
 The Hocussing of Cigarette

In the early 1970s Thames TV presented The Rivals of Sherlock Holmes based on the anthologies by Hugh Greene. The second series (1973) began with "The Mysterious Death on the Underground Railway" featuring Judy Geeson as Polly Burton. In this dramatization, the Old Man is replaced by the character of Polly's uncle, Sir Arthur Inglewood.

The radio series The Teahouse Detective was broadcast on BBC Radio 4 starring Bernard Hepton as "The Man in the Corner" and Suzanne Burdon as Polly Burton.  The stories in the series were adapted for radio by Michael Butt and included:

1998
 The Metropolitan Line Murder (The Mysterious Death on the Underground Railway)
 The York Murder
 The Body in the Barge (The Fenchurch Street Mystery)
 The De Genneville Peerage
2000
 The Dublin Mystery
 The Edinburgh Mystery
 The Brighton Mystery
 The London Mystery (The Regent's Park Murder)

References
 Allan K. Russell (ed.) Rivals of Sherlock Holmes (Castle Books, 1978) 
  T. J. Binyon, "Murder Will Out: The Detective in Fiction", Oxford University Press, 1989, p. 49-50
 E. F. Bleiler (ed.) The Old Man in the Corner, Twelve Mysteries (Dover, 1980)

External links
 
 

1908 short story collections
Short story collections by Baroness Emma Orczy
Fictional detectives
Mystery short story collections
Hodder & Stoughton books
Fictional characters without a name